Sanjay Puri (born 23 November 1961) is an Indian statistical physicist and a senior professor at the School of Physical Sciences of Jawaharlal Nehru University. Known for his research on non-linear dynamics, Puri is an elected fellow of the Indian Academy of Sciences and the Indian National Science Academy. The Council of Scientific and Industrial Research, the apex agency of the Government of India for scientific research, awarded him the Shanti Swarup Bhatnagar Prize for Science and Technology, one of the highest Indian science awards, for his contributions to physical sciences in 2006.

Biography 

Born on 23 November 1961 at Rampur in the Indian state of Uttar Pradesh, Sanjay Puri earned a research-based master's degree (MS), guided by K. P. Jain, for his thesis, Theoretical Investigations of Soliton Dynamics in 1982 from the Indian Institute of Technology, Delhi. Moving to the US, he secured another master's degree in physics from the University of Illinois at Urbana-Champaign in 1983 and continued there for his doctoral studies under guidance of Yoshitsugu Oono to secure a PhD in 1987, his thesis being Some Problems in the Dynamics of Spatially Extended Systems.. Returning to India, Puri joined Jawaharlal Nehru University the same year as an assistant professor at the School of Physical Sciences, became an associate professor in 1993 and has been working there as a professor since 2001. During this period, he also had several stints abroad as a visiting professor at institutions such as Johannes Gutenberg University of Mainz, University of Manchester, Cambridge University and Kyoto University.

Legacy 

The core areas of Puri's work are in statistical physics and nonlinear dynamics with special focus on pattern formation in nonequilibrium systems. His research is reported to have studied the effects of confined geometries and the role of defects in phase separation dynamics and the work is known to have assisted in a wider understanding of kinetics of phase ordering. Study of granular materials, especially freely-evolving granular gases, was another focal point of his work. Puri's studies have been documented by way of a number of articles and the online article repository of the Indian Academy of Sciences has listed 134 of them. Besides, he has published three books, including Dissipative Phenomena in Condensed Matter: Some Applications, co-authored with Sushanta Kumar Dattagupta and Kinetics of Phase Transitions, an edited work. Puri has also guided several students in their studies and serves as the associate editor of Phase Transitions journal of Taylor and Francis.

Awards and honors 
Puri, who topped the IIT Delhi examinations in 1982, was a recipient of the Silver Medal of Excellence of the institute. The Indian National Science Academy awarded him the Young Scientist Medal in 1993 and the International Centre for Theoretical Physics selected him as an associate member in 1994. Puri received the N. S. Satya Murthy Memorial Award of the Indian Physics Association in 1994 followed by B. M. Birla Science Prize in 1999. He was chosen for the Homi Bhabha Fellowship in 2003 and for the J. C. Bose National Fellowship of the Department of Science and Technology in 2012. In between, the Council of Scientific and Industrial Research awarded him the Shanti Swarup Bhatnagar Prize, one of the highest Indian science awards in 2006. Puri is also an elected fellow of two of the three major Indian science academies, the Indian Academy of Sciences electing him in 2006 and the Indian National Science Academy fellowship reaching him in 2012.

Selected bibliography

Books

Articles

See also 

 Kinetics of Phase Separation
 Kinetic theory
 Non-equilibrium thermodynamics

Notes

References

External links 
 

Recipients of the Shanti Swarup Bhatnagar Award in Physical Science
Scientists from Uttar Pradesh
Indian scientific authors
1960 births
Living people
Fellows of the Indian Academy of Sciences
Fellows of the Indian National Science Academy
Indian condensed matter physicists
IIT Delhi alumni
Grainger College of Engineering alumni
Academic staff of Jawaharlal Nehru University
Academic staff of Kyoto University
Academics of the University of Manchester